Justin Christopher Guillen (born January 2, 1986) is a West Indian cricketer who plays for the Trinidad and Tobago national cricket team. He made his debut for the side in the 2008 Stanford Super Series, and has since played over fifteen first-class matches. In May 2010, he was selected to play for the West Indies A.

References

1986 births
Living people
Trinidad and Tobago cricketers
Trinbago Knight Riders cricketers